West Ward School, also known as the West Building Mississinewa Community Schools, is a historic school building located at Gas City, Grant County, Indiana.  It was built between 1900 and 1902, and is a -story, rectangular, Richardsonian Romanesque style brick and stone building. It features a symmetrical main facade with round towers at each corner topped by conical roofs. The building houses a museum and community center.

It was listed on the National Register of Historic Places in 1985.

References

School buildings on the National Register of Historic Places in Indiana
Romanesque Revival architecture in Indiana
School buildings completed in 1902
Schools in Grant County, Indiana
National Register of Historic Places in Grant County, Indiana
1902 establishments in Indiana